Howmeh-ye Sharqi Rural District is a rural district (dehestan) in the Central District of Dasht-e Azadegan County, Khuzestan Province, Iran. At the 2006 census, its population was 23,372, in 4,196 families.  The rural district has 17 villages.

References 

Rural Districts of Khuzestan Province
Dasht-e Azadegan County